.mt is the Internet country code top-level domain (ccTLD) for Malta.

Second-level domains 
Since 1 December 2017, it is possible to register .mt domains directly at the second level, such as myname.mt. Registration is possible at the third level under a number of second level domain names.

 edu.mt: educational institutions
 gov.mt: Malta government entity
 com.mt: commercial entities
 net.mt: Internet-related network service providers
 org.mt: non-profit entities

References

External links 
 IANA .mt whois information
 .mt domain registration website

Country code top-level domains
Internet in Malta
Council of European National Top Level Domain Registries members

sv:Toppdomän#M